The Blue Gulch Reservoir Dam is a dam in Kettle Falls, Washington.  It is owned by Richard Hurst, who also owns the Blue Gulch Reservoir.

The dam was completed in 1926.

References 

Dams in Washington (state)
Buildings and structures in Stevens County, Washington
Dams completed in 1926